Cavacurta is a frazione of Castelgerundo in the Province of Lodi in the Italian region Lombardy, located about  southeast of Milan and about  southeast of Lodi. 

From 1 January 2018 the comune was unified with Camairago and the new municipality took the name of Castelgerundo.

References

Cities and towns in Lombardy